Petráš (feminine Petrášová) is a Slovak family name. Notable people with the name include:

Ján Petráš (born 1986), Slovak football midfielder
Ladislav Petráš (born 1946), Slovak football player
Martin Petráš (born 1979), Slovak football central defender
Peter Petráš (born 1979), Slovak football defender
Samuel Petráš, Slovak football player

Slovak-language surnames